Manufactura de Pilar S.A. is a Paraguayan textile production and manufacturing company, founded in 1930 in incorporated in 1943.

Manufactura de Pilar processes cotton and manufactures various garments and textile goods. Its headquarters is in Asuncion, the capital of Paraguay, while the production plant is in Pilar on the shores of the Rio Paraguay. "La Fabrica", as it is known to locals, employs a large number of the town's residents.

Today, the company has accomplished to open more than 15 locals in different "departamentos" in Paraguay.

Workers employed (2007): 938.

References

External links
 Company website

1930 establishments in Paraguay
Companies established in 1930
Companies based in Asunción
Clothing companies of Paraguay
Paraguayan brands